The suit of Swords is one of the four card suits used in Latin-suited playing cards alongside Coins, Cups and Batons. These suits are used in Spanish, Italian and some tarot card packs. 

Symbol on Italian pattern cards:    Symbol on Spanish pattern cards:    Symbol on French Aluette Spanish pattern cards:

Characteristics 
In Spain, the suit of Swords is known as espadas and the court cards are known as the Rey (King), Caballo (Knight or Cavalier) and Sota (Knave or Valet). The Spanish play with packs of 40 or 48 cards. There are no Tens and, in the shorter pack, the Nines and Eights are also dropped. Thus the suit of Swords ranks: R C S (9 8) 7 6 5 4 3 2 1. In Italy the suit is known as spade and the corresponding court cards are the Re, Cavallo and Fante. Either 40 or 52-card packs are used. In the shorter packs, the Tens, Nines and Eights are removed. Card ranking is thus: R C F (10 9 8) 7 6 5 4 3 2 1. A distinguishing feature is that, in Spanish patterns, the swords are depicted as short and straight, whereas in Italian patterns they are long and curved.

Individual cards 
 Seven of Swords. In Scopa the Seven of Swords, along with the other suit Sevens, is the highest-scoring card in the bonus of primiera.

Tarot 
The suit of swords in some tarot packs is one of several suits used in cartomancy.

See also 
 Spanish playing cards
 Italian playing cards
 Swords - suit used in divinatory tarot cards

Notes and references

Literature

External links

Card suits